Anita Potocskáné Kőrösi (born 23 May 1981 in Siófok), is a Hungarian politician, economist, tax advisor, and chartered accountant, who was a member of Hungarian National Assembly from 2018 to 2022 and vice-president of Jobbik.

Early life 
In 2005 she graduated from College of Dunaújváros in economics. In 2013 she took a degree in accountancy from University of Pannonia. From 2013 she is a PhD student in University of Kaposvár.

She has a state qualification in two foreign languages.

Political career 
She was the deputy mayor of Siófok between 2014 and 2018.

From 2018 to 2022, she is a member of Hungarian National Assembly. She became MP replacing Dávid Janiczak, who decided to remain the mayor of Ózd. On 25 January 2020, she was elected for vice-president of Jobbik. She became deputy president of the party on 7 May 2022.

References

Women members of the National Assembly of Hungary
1981 births
Living people
Jobbik politicians
Members of the National Assembly of Hungary (2018–2022)